The 2021 Cork Lower Intermediate Hurling Championship was the second staging of the Cork Lower Intermediate Hurling Championship since its establishment by the Cork County Board in 2020. The draw for the group stage placings took place on 29 April 2021. The championship began on 12 September 2021 and ended on 20 November 2021.

The final was played on 20 November 2021 at Páirc Uí Chaoimh in Cork, between Lisgoold and Kilbrittain, in what was their first ever meeting in a final in this grade. Lisgoold won the match by 2-19 to 0-14 to claim their first championship title.

Team changes

To Championship

Promoted from the Cork Junior A Hurling Championship
 Lisgoold

Relegated from the Cork Intermediate A Hurling Championship
 Argideen Rangers

From Championship

Promoted to the Cork Intermediate A Hurling Championship
 Castlemartyr

Relegated to the South East Junior A Hurling Championship
 Ballymartle

Results

Group A

Table

Results

Group B

Table

Results

Group C

Table

Results

Relegation stage

Playoff

Knockout stage

Quarter-finals

Semi-finals

Final

References

External link

 Cork GAA website

Cork Lower Intermediate Hurling Championship